Ri Yong-chol (born 8 January 1991) is a North Korean footballer who currently plays as a defender for North Korean club Hwaebul Sports Club.

International career
Ri made his first senior international appearance in a friendly in and against Kuwait on 31 October 2014, playing his entire debut match.

References

External links
 
 

1991 births
Living people
Association football defenders
North Korean footballers
North Korea international footballers